Roger Caron (born December 18, 1957 in Matane) is a Canadian sport shooter. He tied for 38th place in the men's 50 metre rifle prone event at the 2000 Summer Olympics.

References

1957 births
Living people
ISSF rifle shooters
Canadian male sport shooters
Olympic shooters of Canada
Shooters at the 2000 Summer Olympics